Christopher Beckett may be:

 Chris Beckett (born 1955), British writer, social worker, and academic
 Christopher Beckett, 4th Baron Grimthorpe (1915–2003), British soldier and company director

See also 
 Christopher Beckett Denison (1825–1884), British colonial administrator and Conservative politician